Goldmann is the surname of several people:
 Erich Goldmann, German ice hockey player
 Friedrich Goldmann (1941–2009), German composer and conductor
 Hans Goldmann (1899–1991), Swiss ophthalmologist
 Lucien Goldmann, French philosopher and sociologist
 Maximilian Goldmann, real name of Max Reinhardt, Austrian theatre director
 Nahum Goldmann, former president of the World Jewish Congress
 Ulrike Goldmann, singer for German band Blutengel
 Stefan Goldmann (born 1978), German-Bulgarian DJ and composer of electronic music

It can also refer to:
 Goldmann (publisher), large publishing house in Germany

See also 
 Goldman (disambiguation)

German-language surnames
Jewish surnames
Yiddish-language surnames